The Bus & Coach Society of Victoria (BCSV) is a bus preservation society in Melbourne, Australia established in December 1968.

Publications
From 1975 until 1986, the BCSV's house journal was Fleetline that was published by the Historic Commercial Vehicle Association. In 1986, the BCSV ended its involvement with Fleetline and founded two bi-monthly publications; Australian Bus Panorama and Australian Bus Heritage.

References

Historical societies of Australia
Organizations established in 1968
1968 establishments in Australia